Sport 2000 Paramotori was an Italian aircraft manufacturer based in Capena and founded by Pietrucci Mauro. The company specialized in the design and manufacture of paramotors in the form of ready-to-fly aircraft for the US FAR 103 Ultralight Vehicles rules and the European microlight category.

The company seems to have been founded about 2001 and gone out of business in 2005.

Sport 2000 produced the Model 80 paramotor in two sub-variants, the LM and AM, the LM having more endurance.

Aircraft

References

External links
Company website archives on Archive.org

Defunct aircraft manufacturers of Italy
Ultralight aircraft
Paramotors